The 2012 Western Pennsylvania Sting season was the first season and only season for the Ultimate Indoor Football League (UIFL) franchise.

The Sting were originally created to replace the Saginaw Sting, who had left the league to re-join the Continental Indoor Football League (CIFL). The Sting had an agreement to host games at Cambria County War Memorial Arena in Johnstown, Pennsylvania, as well as other cities throughout Western Pennsylvania.

On November 30, 2011, the Sting announced that Paul Pennington would be their first coach in franchise history.

On May 15, 2012, the Sting were suspended by the league due to a lack of funds.

The Sting were able to finish the season with an 0-7 record, and failed to qualify for the playoffs.

Schedule
Key:

Regular season

Standings

Final roster

References

Western Pennsylvania Sting
Western Pennsylvania Sting